Jules de Jongh is an American voice actress. She provided the voices of Yugo and Evangelyne in the first 2 seasons of Wakfu: The Animated Series, the voice of the protagonist Faith from the video game Mirror's Edge, and the voice of several characters in Thomas & Friends. She also voiced Skunk, the protagonist from the Irish animated series Skunk Fu!.

Life and career
She was born in California, and raised in Visalia. Following training at the California Institute of the Arts in theater, she went on to appear in a number of Hollywood films but disliked moving from one location to another during production.

Filmography

Films and television

Video games

Jules de Jongh has also provided various voices for numerous commercials, for clients including TGI Friday's, Diet Pepsi and J2O. She has also narrated several productions for Channel Five.

References

MobyGames
Rhubarb Voice Agent

External links
 

Living people
Actresses from California
American video game actresses
American voice actresses
California Institute of the Arts alumni
Place of birth missing (living people)
Year of birth missing (living people)
20th-century American actresses
21st-century American actresses
American expatriates in the United Kingdom